Captain Blood: His Odyssey is an adventure novel by Rafael Sabatini, originally published in 1922.

Development
Sabatini was a proponent of basing historical fiction as closely as possible on history. Although Blood is a fictional character, much of the historical background of the novel is loosely based on fact. A group of Monmouth rebels was indeed condemned to ten years' hard labor in Barbados, very similar to chattel slavery; and the shifting political alliances of the Glorious Revolution of 1688 are used in the novel as a plot device to allow Blood's return to respectability.

Sabatini based the first part of the story of Blood on Henry Pitman, a surgeon who tended the wounded Monmouth rebels and was sentenced to death by Judge Jeffreys, but whose sentence was commuted to penal transportation to Barbados where he escaped and was captured by pirates. Unlike the fictional Blood, Pitman did not join them, and eventually made his way back to England where he wrote a popular account of his ordeal. For Blood's life as a buccaneer, Sabatini used several models, including Henry Morgan and the work of Alexandre Exquemelin, for historical details.

Sabatini first introduced the character Captain Blood in a series of eight short stories in Premier Magazine as Tales of the Brethren of the Main, published from December 1920 to March 1921, and reprinted in Adventure Magazine from January to May 1921, with a novella "Captain Blood's Dilemma", published in Premier Magazine in April 1921 (and Adventure Magazine in October 1921). The Odyssey-like story arc of these tales was then woven by Sabatini into a continuous narrative in novel form, published as Captain Blood: His Odyssey in 1922.

Synopsis 
The protagonist is the sharp-witted Dr. Peter Blood, a fictional Irish physician who had had a wide-ranging career as a soldier and sailor (including a commission as a captain under the Dutch admiral De Ruyter) before settling down to practice medicine in the town of Bridgwater in Somerset. The story is told from the perspective of an omniscient narrator, who enables the reader to see the thoughts and views of many different characters. The narrator - perhaps meant to be Sabatini himself - claims to have acquired the story from the ship's logs of Blood's longtime companion Jeremy Pitt. 

The book opens with him attending to his geraniums while the town prepares to fight for James Scott, 1st Duke of Monmouth. He wants no part in the rebellion, but while attending to some of the rebels wounded at the Battle of Sedgemoor, Peter is arrested. During the Bloody Assizes, he is convicted by the infamous Judge Jeffreys of treason on the grounds that "if any person be in actual rebellion against the King, and another person—who really and actually was not in rebellion—does knowingly receive, harbour, comfort, or succour him, such a person is as much a traitor as he who indeed bore arms."

The sentence for treason is death by hanging, but King James II, for purely financial reasons, has the sentence for Blood and other convicted rebels commuted to transportation to the Caribbean, where they are to be imprisoned. Upon arrival on the island of Barbados, Blood is bought by Colonel William Bishop, initially for work in the Colonel's prison farms but later hired out by Bishop when Blood's skills as a physician prove superior to those of the local doctors. During his period of slavery, Blood becomes acquainted with and even friendly with Arabella Bishop, Colonel Bishop's niece, who becomes sympathetic after learning his history.

When a Spanish force attacks and raids the town of Bridgetown, Blood escapes with a number of other convicts (including former shipmaster Jeremy Pitt, the one-eyed giant Edward Wolverstone, former gentleman Nathaniel Hagthorpe, former Royal Navy petty officer Nicholas Dyke and former Royal Navy master gunner Ned Ogle), captures the Spaniards' ship and sails away to become one of the most successful pirates in the Caribbean, hated and feared by the Spanish and always sparing English ships. Colonel Bishop, humiliated by Blood's escape and by Blood himself, devotes himself to capturing Blood with the hope of hanging him.

After the Glorious Revolution, Blood is pardoned. As a reward for saving the colony of Jamaica from a French assault, he is appointed its governor in place of Colonel Bishop, who had abandoned his post to hunt for Blood, and the novel ends with the implication that Blood will not only marry Colonel Bishop's niece Arabella but will also let Bishop off easy.

Influence

Continuation
Captain Blood was an enormously popular work, but instead of continuing the series with sequels, Sabatini wrote fifteen more short stories set during Captain Blood's pirate career. Two of the tales in Captain Blood Returns ("The War Indemnity" and "Blood Money") may be viewed as continuations of events that took place in the original novel, but all the stories are contained within the timeframe of Captain Blood (a sidequel).

Eight of these new stories were published in 1931 as Captain Blood Returns (retitled The Chronicles of Captain Blood in the British publication) along with two of the Tales of the Brethren of the Main that had not been incorporated into Captain Blood. A second collection, The Fortunes of Captain Blood was published in 1936, consisting of six new stories, and one final story, "The Remedy", which takes place almost immediately after Blood's trial before Judge Jeffreys and in which Peter Blood is not the primary character but is prominently figured. It was also included in Sabatini's collection of short stories Turbulent Tales, published in 1946.

The book was especially popular in Russia. Several Russian authors wrote moderately popular sequels, such as Children of Captain Blood by Tatyana Vinogradova, and Captain Blood: His Iliad by Mikhail Popov.

Literary references
The bitter aftermath of the Monmouth Rebellion also features prominently in Arthur Conan Doyle's novel Micah Clarke (1889).

In the opening chapter of Arturo Pérez-Reverte's novel The Club Dumas (1993), two characters discuss their favourite novel by Sabatini; book dealer Lucas Corso declares his preference for Captain Blood.

Alan Moore's comic book series The League of Extraordinary Gentlemen incorporates many characters from classic books, including Peter Blood as a member of the Pirates' Conference in The New Traveller's Almanac (2002–2003).

Adaptations

Film
 Captain Blood (1924), starring J. Warren Kerrigan
 Captain Blood (1935), starring Errol Flynn
 Fortunes of Captain Blood (1950), starring Louis Hayward
 Captain Pirate (1952), aka Captain Blood, Fugitive (UK), starring Louis Hayward
 The Son of Captain Blood (1962), starring Sean Flynn (Errol Flynn's son) 
 L'odyssée du capitaine Blood (1991), starring Yves Lambrecht: a Franco-Russian co-production which had a 1991 theatrical release in the USSR (as Одиссея капитана Блада) and was a March 1992 two-episode broadcast by France 3

Audio
Captain Blood. Full Cast Audio production (2006) The Colonial Radio Theatre on the Air. Released by Blackstone Audio.

Comics
 Captain Blood, adapted in Fast Fiction #2, 1949, reprinted in Stories by Famous Authors Illustrated #2, 1950.
Captain Blood: The Legacy, a five-issue sepia-toned comic adaptation of the novel by Matt Shepherd and Mike Shoyket (2009, SLG Comics)

Video games
Age of Pirates: Captain Blood
Age of Pirates 2: City of Abandoned Ships

Notes

References

External links

 
 
 

1922 British novels
Novels by Rafael Sabatini
British historical novels
British adventure novels
Novels about pirates
British novels adapted into films
Novels set in Somerset
Monmouth Rebellion in fiction
Novels set in the 1680s
Cultural depictions of Henry Morgan